Kolowrat-Krakowsky is an historic Bohemian family from Central Europe. It is a branch of the Kolowrat family.

The Kolowrat family originated in Central Bohemia, in what is today the Czech Republic, in the 13th century. 

The Kolowrat-Krakowsky branch of the Kolowrat family still exists today in the Czech Republic and the United States. Over the past 600 years, this family branch has produced:

 patrons of the arts, culture, education
 merchants and business owners
 holders of inherited imperial and Bohemian titles, including knighthoods in the Order of the Golden Fleece and the Order of Malta
 field marshals, prime ministers, high chancellors, royal governors, governors, ambassadors, archbishops and supporters of the Czech National Revival movement.

Branches of Kolowrat family 
During the 14th and 15th centuries, the Kolowrat family split into eight family branches.  Of these eight branches, only the Krakowsky branch, the largest one, survived into the 21st century. The branches were:
 Liebsteinský
 Kornhauzský
 Žehrovický
 Bezdružický
 Nowohradský
 Mašťovský
 Černonický
 Krakowský

Early history

The three Albrechts 
Albrecht the Older is considered the founder of the Kolowrat family  He was born in the 13th or 14th century in the village of Kolovraty in what is today the Czech Republic. Hence the name "Kolowrat".

Albrecht served as a hetman, a court marshal of Anna of Schweidnitz, and an assessor of the provincial and royal feudal court.  In 1347, when Rožmitál castle was sold,  Albrecht was mentioned as an assessing witness. He married three times and had eight children. Albrecht's six sons laid the foundation of the Kolowrat family.

In 1373, Albrecht the Younger established an Augustinian monastery of the Assumption in Ročov, where he was later buried.

Albrecht I (1422–1470) acquired Krakovec castle near what is today Krakovec, Czech Republic. The name "Krakowsky" derives from the castle name.  Albrecht was the founder of the Kolowrat-Krakowský branch.

Leopold Vilém and sons 
A much later descendent, Count Leopold Vilém (1727–1809), was a close friend of the Hapsburg Empress Maria Theresia  and a holder of the Order of the Golden Fleece. Vilém married twice and had 17 children,

Count František Xaver (1783–1855), Villam's youngest son, is the common ancestor of all living Kolowrat-Krakowsky descendents. 

 Xaver's eldest son Leopold (1804–1884) established the "Týn" lineage, also known as "Leopold's".  His descendants manage the forests around Tachov and Klatovy, as well as own property in Prague.
 Xaver's second son Theodor (1806–1875) established the "Rychnovian" lineage, also known as "Theodor's". They, reside close to Rychnov nad Kněžnou and currently use the combined family name Krakowský-Liebsteinský of Kolowrat.  Their residence in Rychnovsko is administered by Jan Egon Kolowrat Krakowsky-Libstejnsky, the son of Count Kryštof Jaroslav Kolowrat Krakowsky-Libstejnsky, who, after 1989, returned from exile in Austria.

Modern history

Leopold Filip and Sascha Kolowrat-Krakowsky 
Leopold Filip Kolowrat-Krakowsky (1852–1910) became the administrator of the family property in the second half of the 19th century. He was a member of the Imperial Council of the Austro-Hungarian Emprire and later serve in the Bohemian Assembly. Leopold Filip was a Second Class Knight of the Order of the Iron Crown. Apart from the Přimda estate and the estate in Klatovsko, he also administered the Kolowrat Palace and the New Kolowrat Palace in Prague.

Alexander Kolowrat-Krakowsky (1886–1927), Leopold Filip's oldest son, inherited the Kolowrat-Krakowsky estate became his oldest son. Alexander, called Sascha, was a successful car and motorcycle racing driver but also a film producer. Sascha  founded the Sascha-Film company, which discovered actor Marlene Dietrich. As a racing driver, Sascha received many awards and became the right hand of car builder Václav Klement. In Sascha's honor, an annual gathering of antique cars, is held in Přimda.

Jindřich Kolowrat-Krakowsky 
When Sascha died of cancer in 1927, his brother, Jindřich Vilém Kolowrat-Krakowsky (1897–1996), became administrator of the family estate. A builder, Jindřich erected the Functionalist-styled Palace Chicago in Prague. He founded the Wooden Houses Kolowrat company, where he employed 600 permanent workers.

In 1943, the German-controlled government of Czechoslovakia nationalized the Kolowrat-Krakowsky estate, removing it from Jindřich's control.  After the end of World War II in 1945, President Edvard Beneš of the new Czechoslovak government returned the estate to Jindřich.  He would serve as ambassador to as the Czechoslovak ambassador to Turkey until 1948, when emigrated with his family to the United States.

In February 1948, the new Czechoslovak Socialist Republic nationalized the Kolowrat-Krakowsky estate again. In 1950, the government dissolved the Wooden Houses Kolowrat. In 1960, the Diana hunting lodge owned by the family was converted into a retirement home.

In 1992, after the fall of the communist regime in 1989, the Kolowrat-Krakowsky estate was returned to the Kolowrat-Krakowsky family. Jindřich and his youngest son, František Tomáš Kolowrat-Krakowsky (1943–2004) returned to Czechoslovia. In 1991, Jindřich had received the Order of Tomáš Garrigue Masaryk, Second Class, from President Václav Havel. In 1993, Jindřich rented the Kolowrat Palace to the National Theatre in Prague for one Czech Crown per year.

František Kolowrat-Krakowsky 
After Jindřich died in 1996 at age 98,  František became his successor. He was the only one of Jindřich's children who returned permanently to the Czech Republic.

František repaired the Hraničky Ponds and the Václavský Pond, which came to be used in the Přimda Triathlon. He built private wood roads that became cycle paths that connect different areas of the Upper Palatine Forest. In an effort to increase tourism and develop Přimda, František bought the ruins of Přimda castle and converted it into Mountain Hotel Kolowrat.

In 1997, František bought three new bells for the Roman St. George's Church in Přimda, as the original bells had been destroyed after World War II. He made a significant donation to the Czech Red Cross after flooding in the Czech Republic in 2002. František supported other charities, schools, cultural organizations

In 2001, the Forestry of František Tomáš Kolowrat-Krakowsky was ranked in the top 100 companies of agricultural production, food industry and forestry. He was recognized by Comenius - the Pan-European Society for Culture, Education and Scientific and Technical Cooperation.

František died prematurely in 2004. After his death, Dominika Kolowrat-Krakowska became the new administrator of the family property.

Important personalities 
 Albrecht the older Lord of Kolowraty († 1391), Founder of the St. Augustine's order's monastery in Dolni Rocov
 Albrecht the younger Lord of Kolowraty (mentioned 1369–1416), Co-founder of the Augustinian monastery in Dolni Rocov
 Albrecht I. Lord of Kolowrat (mentioned 1422–1470), Associate of the Feudal court
 Jindřich Albrecht Lord of Kolowrat and Krakovec (mentioned 1479–1530), The highest judge of feudal court in Bohemia
 Albrecht II. Lord of Kolowrat (mentioned 1503–1542), Governor of Rakovník region
 Jan Lord Kolowrat-Krakowsky (mentioned 1530–1555), Governor of Rakovnik region
 Kryštof Jindřich Lord Krakowsky of Kolowrat (1549–1596), Governor of Rakovnik region
 Bohuslav Jiří Lord Krakowsky of Kolowrat (1596–1638/41), Chamberlain and Imperial Council
 Vilém Albrecht I. Count Krakowsky of Kolowrat (1600–1688), Chief Feudal judge and chief bailiff of the Czech kingdom, Sponsor
 Kryštof Jaroslav Lord Krakowsky of Kolowrat (mentioned 1604–1659), Imperial Council, Associate of feudal chambre court, Sponsor
 Jan František Count Krakowsky of Kolowrat (1649–1723), The Highest Chancellor of the Kingdom of Bohemia, Royal Commissioner
 Albrecht Jindřich Count Krakowsky of Kolowrat (1655–1704), Governor of the Rakovník region
 Maximilian Norbert Count Krakowsky of Kolowrat (1660–1721), Supreme Provincial Chamberlain, President of the Appellate Council in Bohemia, Sponsor
 Vilém Albrecht II. Count Krakowsky of Kolowrat, Baron of Újezd (1678–1738), The Highest Chancellor of the Bohemian Royal Court
 Filip Nerius (Neri) Count Krakowsky of Kolowrat (1686–1773), Knight of the Golden Fleece, Grand Burgrave, Supreme Judge
 Kajetán František Count Krakowsky of Kolowrat (1689–1769), Field marshal and military commander in Moravia
 Emanuel Václav Kajetán Count Krakowsky of Kolowrat (1700–1769), Cavalry General, The owner of the Kolowrat dragoon regiment, Grand Prior of the Order of Malta
 Prokop Jan Count Krakowsky of Kolowrat, Baron of Újezd (1718–1774), Supreme feudal judge, Supreme Judge in Bohemia
 Leopold Vilém Count Krakowsky of Kolowrat (1727–1809), Knight of the Order of the Golden Fleece, The supreme Czech-Austrian Chancellor, First Minister of State and Conference Minister, Founder of the Order of Saint Joachim
 Jan Nepomuk Karel Josef Count Krakowsky of Kolowrat, Baron of Újezd (1748–1816), Commander of the Order of the Knights of Malta, Commanding general in Bohemia, Lieutenant Field Marshal
 Alois Josef Count Krakowsky of Kolowrat, Baron of Újezd (1759–1833), Archbishop of Prague
 František Xaver I. Count Krakowsky of Kolowrat (1783–1855), Chamberlain, Lieutenant-Colonel (Oberstleutnant)
 Jan Nepomuk Karel (called Hanuš) Count Krakowský-Nowohradský of Kolowrat, Baron of Újezd (1794–1872), Honorable Knight of the Order of the Knights of Malta, Chamberlain, Imperial Privy Council, Sponsor
 František Xaver II. Count Krakowsky of Kolowrat (1803–1873), Czech grand prior of the Maltese knights order, The ambassador at the Hapsburg imperial court in Vienna
 Leopold Maria Meinrad Adam Camillo Johann Nepomuk Raimund Count Krakowsky of Kolowrat (1804–1863), Field Marshal, the right hand of Marshal Joseph Radetzky von Radetz
 Leopold Filip Count Krakowsky of Kolowrat (1852–1910), Member of the Imperial Council and the Czech Assembly, Second Class knight of the Order of the Iron Crown
 Alexandr Joseph Count Krakowsky of Kolowrat (1886–1927), Film producer, car and motorcycle racing driver
 Bertha née Countess Krakowsky of Kolowrat, Countess of Colloredo-Mannsfeld (1890-1982), grandmother and guardian of Igor and Grichka Bogdanoff
 Jindřich Josef Vilém Albrecht Pavel Count Krakowsky of Kolowrat (1897–1996), Politician,  and restorer of the family estate
 František Sal. Tomáš Karel Count Krakowsky of Kolowrat (1943–2004), family property administration

Bibliography 
 HALADA, Jan. Lexikon české šlechty : Erby, fakta, osobnosti, sídla a zajímavosti. 1. Praha : Akropolis, 1992. . Kapitola Kolovratové, s. 75–77.
 JUŘÍK, Pavel. Kolowratové. Věrně a stále. Praha: Euromedia - Knižní klub, 2016. 152 s. .

External links 

 historie rodu na stránkách prirodakarlovarska.cz
 www.kolowrat.cz
 Dokument ČT - Modrá krev: Kolowratové
 Dokument ČT - Lidé s Erbem
 Dokument ČT - GEN: Jindřich hrabě Kolowrat-Krakowský
 http://www.ceskatelevize.cz/ct24/exkluzivne-na-ct24/osobnosti-na-ct24/37095-muj-neurozeny-puvod-byl-mozna-vyhodou-rika-dominika-kolowrat-krakovska/
 http://ona.idnes.cz/dominika-kolowrat-krakovska-nejsem-zlatokopka-jak-si-mnozi-mysli-1cc-/spolecnost.aspx?c=A080424_160210_ona_ony_jup

Bohemian noble families
Habsburg Bohemian nobility